NYS may refer to:

New York Skyports Seaplane Base (IATA: NYS)
 National Youth Service, of several countries
 New York State
 New York Shipbuilding, a corporation
 Nyungar language (ISO 639-3: nys), an Australian Aboriginal language or dialect continuum